Andres Lauk (born 16 October 1964) is an Estonian cyclist. He competed in the men's individual road race at the 1996 Summer Olympics.

References

External links
 

1964 births
Living people
Estonian male cyclists
Olympic cyclists of Estonia
Cyclists at the 1996 Summer Olympics
People from Saaremaa Parish